"Somewhere Near Japan" is a song written for the American rock band The Beach Boys. It was released on their 1989 album Still Cruisin'.

Backstory
The bulk of the song was written by John Phillips and concerns his daughter Mackenzie Phillips's honeymoon experiences. She and her new husband, both serious substance abusers, flew to Guam and when the money and drugs ran out, she made a late-night phone call to her father begging him to send money or drugs, preferably both; when he asked where she was, the reply was "somewhere near Japan". Phillips' original version of the song, titled "Fairy Tale Girl", allegedly ran to over 25 verses.  A late-1980s recording by The New Mamas and The Papas (John Phillips, Mackenzie Phillips, Scott McKenzie, and Spanky McFarlane) under the title "Fairy Tale Girl (Somewhere Near Japan)" was belatedly released on the 2010 compilation Many Mamas, Many Papas from Varèse Sarabande.

The final Beach Boys release describes a protagonist agreeing to come to the rescue of his "fairy tale girl" who is "driftin' on some Chinese junk" (a double entendre for both heroin and a type of ship), despite the likelihood that she will "break [his] heart one more time"—concluding that "I broke her fall and I always will."

Recording
"Somewhere Near Japan" features the lead vocals of Mike Love, Carl Wilson, Al Jardine and Bruce Johnston.  Brian Wilson was not included in the recording of the song, as he was involved with Eugene Landy at the time of recording and was not actively participating in many Beach Boys projects.  He did, however, appear in the music video. The single release is a remix of the album recording.  The 12-string guitars, mandolin & solo were played by Los Angeles studio musician, Craig T. Fall. The main recording was done at Al Jardine's Red Barn Studios in Big Sur, Calif. The programming, including drums/keyboards were done by Keith Wechsler, who also was the engineer on the Still Cruisin' album, and the Summer in Paradise album.  The song was produced by Terry Melcher, who co-wrote the song, helped arrange the background vocals.

Music video
The music video features Brian Wilson, Carl Wilson, Al Jardine, Bruce Johnston and Mike Love.  In the closing moments of Somewhere Near Japan, all five members of the band were featured together for the first time since the Beach Boys video California Dreamin'; however, Brian Wilson's footage was filmed separately from the remaining four and was superimposed into the shot. It was produced by Paul Flattery and  directed by Jim Yukich of FYI - Flattery Yukich Inc.

Charts

Personnel
Mike Love – lead vocals
Carl Wilson – lead vocals
Al Jardine – lead vocals
Bruce Johnston – lead vocals, keyboards
Craig Trippand Fall – lead guitar, mandolin
Keith Wechsler – drums, keyboards, programming
Terry Melcher – backing vocals

References

1989 songs
The Beach Boys songs
Songs written by Mike Love
Songs written by Terry Melcher
Songs written by Bruce Johnston
Song recordings produced by Terry Melcher
Capitol Records singles
Songs written by John Phillips (musician)